"Came Here for Love" is a song by English DJ and record producer Sigala and English singer-songwriter Ella Eyre. It was written by Klingande, Bryn Christopher and Scott Wild, with the song's production handled by Sigala, Klingande, White N3rd and Joakim Jarl. It was released to digital retailers on 9 June 2017, through Ministry of Sound Group and B1 Recordings.

Background

In an interview with Official Charts Company, Sigala said: "I'm really, really excited about it. The last few releases feel like they've been more collaborative – Craig David, Digital Farm Animals and the Hailee Steinfeld/Kato song – but this one feels more like my record, if you know what I mean. I'm so happy it's coming out – hopefully it'll be the first of many this year." When asked about how the collaboration came together, he said: "It was written with Bryn Christopher originally, who sang Sweet Lovin'. He'd pretty much written all the vocals and came to me with the idea for the song. We developed it from there and thought about getting Ella on it – we share the same manager. She helped us finish the song. The difficult thing with Bryn is he comes in with that crazy voice of his, so it's about finding someone to match that. Ella's one of the few people who can do that." In an interview with The List, he said: "We had planned to do a collaboration somewhere along the line, but we were just waiting for the right time and the right song."

When asked about the best bit of this song, he said: "The hands in the air moment is probably the 'came here for love' lyric. It's not the drop, but it's the building up to it moment. It's got the pianos and Ella's amazing vocals. It's the bit that puts a smile on my face anyway!"

Track listing

Credits and personnel
Credits adapted from Tidal.

Charts

Weekly charts

Year-end charts

Certifications

Release history

References

2017 singles
2017 songs
Ella Eyre songs
Sigala songs
Songs written by Bryn Christopher
Songs written by Ella Eyre
Songs written by Sigala
Tropical house songs
Songs written by Klingande